Juhani Salakka (13 September 1950 – 17 February 2015) was a Finnish weightlifter. He competed in the men's lightweight event at the 1980 Summer Olympics.

References

1950 births
2015 deaths
Finnish male weightlifters
Olympic weightlifters of Finland
Weightlifters at the 1980 Summer Olympics
Sportspeople from Lahti